Frank Gosling (3 August 1917 – 13 February 2001) was a Bermudian diver. He competed at the 1948 Summer Olympics and the 1952 Summer Olympics.

References

1917 births
2001 deaths
Bermudian male divers
Olympic divers of Bermuda
Divers at the 1948 Summer Olympics
Divers at the 1952 Summer Olympics
People from Paget Parish